Jackson Zophar Howell (born January 29, 1899 – February 25, 1967) was an American competition swimmer who represented the United States at the 1920 Summer Olympics in Antwerp, Belgium.  Howell competed in both the men's 200-meter breaststroke and the men's 400-meter breaststroke, and finished in fourth place in both event finals.

References

External links
 

1899 births
1967 deaths
American male breaststroke swimmers
Olympic swimmers of the United States
Swimmers from San Francisco
Swimmers at the 1920 Summer Olympics
20th-century American people